The 1961 Duke Blue Devils baseball team represented Duke University in the 1961 NCAA University Division baseball season. The Blue Devils played their home games at Jack Coombs Field. The team was coached by Ace Parker in his 9th year at Duke.

The Blue Devils won the District III playoff to advanced to the College World Series, where they were defeated by the Boston College Eagles.

Roster

Schedule 

! style="" | Regular Season
|- valign="top" 

|- align="center" bgcolor="#ffcccc"
| 1 || March 27 || at  || Seminole Field • Tallahassee, Florida || 6–10 || 0–1 || –
|- align="center" bgcolor="#ffcccc"
| 2 || March 28 || at Florida State || Seminole Field • Tallahassee, Florida || 0–4 || 0–2 || –
|- align="center" bgcolor="#ffcccc"
| 3 || March 29 || at Florida State || Seminole Field • Tallahassee, Florida || 5–7 || 0–3 || –
|- align="center" bgcolor="#ffcccc"
| 4 || March 30 || at Florida State || Seminole Field • Tallahassee, Florida || 2–8 || 0–4 || –
|-

|- align="center" bgcolor="#ccffcc"
| 5 || April 1 || vs Western Michigan || Seminole Field • Tallahassee, Florida || 10–3 || 1–4 || –
|- align="center" bgcolor="#ffcccc"
| 6 || April 3 ||  || Jack Coombs Field • Durham, North Carolina || 3–5 || 1–5 || –
|- align="center" bgcolor="#ccffcc"
| 7 || April 3 || Ohio || Jack Coombs Field • Durham, North Carolina || 2–1 || 2–5 || –
|- align="center" bgcolor="#ccffcc"
| 8 || April 7 || at  || Riggs Field • Clemson, South Carolina || 8–5 || 3–5 || 1–0
|- align="center" bgcolor="#ccffcc"
| 9 || April 8 || at  || Unknown • Columbia, South Carolina || 8–1 || 4–5 || 2–0
|- align="center" bgcolor="#ccffcc"
| 10 || April 14 || at  || Shipley Field • College Park, Maryland || 11–5 || 5–5 || 3–0
|- align="center" bgcolor="#ccffcc"
| 11 || April 15 || at  || Unknown • Charlottesville, Virginia || 9–2 || 6–5 || 4–0
|- align="center" bgcolor="#ffcccc"
| 12 || April 18 || at  || Riddick Stadium • Raleigh, North Carolina || 1–3 || 6–6 || 4–1
|- align="center" bgcolor="#ffcccc"
| 13 || April 21 ||  || Jack Coombs Field • Durham, North Carolina || 4–9 || 6–7 || 4–2
|- align="center" bgcolor="#ffcccc"
| 14 || April 25 || NC State || Jack Coombs Field • Durham, North Carolina || 1–3 || 6–8 || 4–3
|- align="center" bgcolor="#ccffcc"
| 15 || April 29 || Maryland || Jack Coombs Field • Durham, North Carolina || 5–1 || 7–8 || 5–3
|-

|- align="center" bgcolor="#ccffcc"
| 16 || May 2 || at North Carolina || Emerson Field • Chapel Hill, North Carolina || 10–4 || 8–8 || 6–3
|- align="center" bgcolor="#ccffcc"
| 17 || May 5 || South Carolina || Jack Coombs Field • Durham, North Carolina || 1–0 || 9–8 || 7–3
|- align="center" bgcolor="#ccffcc"
| 18 || May 6 || Clemson || Jack Coombs Field • Durham, North Carolina || 3–1 || 10–8 || 8–3
|- align="center" bgcolor="#ccffcc"
| 19 || May 8 ||  || Jack Coombs Field • Durham, North Carolina || 12–10 || 11–8 || 9–3
|- align="center" bgcolor="#ccffcc"
| 20 || May 10 || at Wake Forest || Ernie Shore Field • Winston-Salem, North Carolina || 3–1 || 12–8 || 10–3
|- align="center" bgcolor="#ffcccc"
| 21 || May 13 || at  || Unknown • Annapolis, Maryland || 4–1 || 12–9 || 10–3
|- align="center" bgcolor="#ccffcc"
| 22 || May 19 || at Virginia || Unknown • Charlottesville, Virginia || 5–1 || 13–9 || 11–3
|-

|-
|-
! style="" | Postseason
|- valign="top"

|- align="center" bgcolor="#ccffcc"
| 23 || June 1 || vs  || Sims Legion Park • Gastonia, North Carolina || 7–2 || 14–9 || 11–3
|- align="center" bgcolor="#ccffcc"
| 24 || June 3 || vs  || Sims Legion Park • Gastonia, North Carolina || 7–3 || 15–9 || 11–3
|-

|- align="center" bgcolor="#ffcccc"
| 25 || June 9 || vs Oklahoma State || Omaha Municipal Stadium • Omaha, Nebraska || 2–3 || 15–10 || 11–3
|- align="center" bgcolor="#ccffcc"
| 26 || June 11 || vs Colorado State College || Omaha Municipal Stadium • Omaha, Nebraska || 15–3 || 16–10 || 11–3
|- align="center" bgcolor="#ffcccc"
| 27 || June 12 || vs Boston College || Omaha Municipal Stadium • Omaha, Nebraska || 3–4 || 16–11 || 11–3
|-

Awards and honors 
Don Altman
 Second Team All-Atlantic Coast Conference

Ron Davis
 Second Team All-Atlantic Coast Conference
 All-District III Tournament Team
 College World Series All-Tournament Team

Lynn Fader
 First Team All-Atlantic Coast Conference
 All-District III Tournament Team

Rex McKinley
 Second Team All-Atlantic Coast Conference

Garry Miller
 Second Team All-Atlantic Coast Conference

Butch Williams
 All-District III Tournament Team'

References 

Duke Blue Devils baseball seasons
Duke Blue Devils baseball
College World Series seasons
Duke
Atlantic Coast Conference baseball champion seasons